"The Weekend" is a song written by Bill LaBounty and Beckie Foster, and recorded by American country music artist Steve Wariner.  It was released in April 1987 as the second single from the album It's a Crazy World.  It was a number-one hit in both the United States and Canada, spending 23 weeks on the Billboard Hot Country Singles & Tracks chart.

Music video
The music video was directed by Michael Salomon.

Charts

Weekly charts

Year-end charts

References

1987 singles
Steve Wariner songs
1986 songs
Music videos directed by Michael Salomon
Songs written by Bill LaBounty
Song recordings produced by Jimmy Bowen
Song recordings produced by Tony Brown (record producer)
MCA Records singles
Songs written by Beckie Foster